Rada Mikhailovna Granovskaya (13 August 1929 – 17 April 2022) was a well-known psychologist, professor of the Saint Petersburg State University; academician of the Baltic Academy of Pedagogical Sciences and the International Academy of Acmeology. Her basic works are on practical psychology and psychological protection. She is an author of conceptual model of interaction of thinking of the person with system of the subconscious and realized psychological barriers, and also mechanisms and ways of their overcoming.

Bibliography
 Elements of practical psychology. — L.: Publishing house LGU, 1984. — SPb.: Svet, 1997. — L.: Publishing house LGU, 1988. — SPb.: Svetas, 2000. — SPb.: Rech, 2003. — SPb.: Rech, 2007
 Psychology of faith. — SPb.: Rech, 2004
 Psychology in examples. — SPb.: Rech, 2002. — SPb.: Rech, 2007
 Creativity and the conflict in a mirror of psychology. — SPb.: Rech, 2006
 Psychological protection. — SPb.: Rech, 2007

References

External links
Books in Rech Publishing House
All books in BIBLUS
Saint-Petersburg Academy of Acmeology

1929 births
2022 deaths
Soviet psychologists
Psychologists from Saint Petersburg
Russian women psychologists
Saint Petersburg Electrotechnical University alumni
Academic staff of Saint Petersburg State University